Differences: A Journal of Feminist Cultural Studies (stylized "differences") is a peer-reviewed academic journal that was established in 1989 by Naomi Schor and Elizabeth Weed. It covers research in cultural studies. As of 2021, the editors-in-chief are Elizabeth Weed and Ellen Rooney. The journal, though autonomous, is housed by the Pembroke Center for Teaching and Research on Women (Brown University). It was originally published by Indiana University Press, but since 2003 (volume 14) it has been published by Duke University Press.

Abstracting and indexing 
The journal is abstracted and indexed in:

According to the Journal Citation Reports, the journal has a 2015 impact factor of 0.310, ranking it 31st out of 40 journals in the category "Women's Studies".

See also 
 List of women's studies journals

References

External links 
 

Cultural journals
Duke University Press academic journals
English-language journals
Publications established in 1989
Triannual journals
Women's studies journals